The Pongch'ŏn Colliery Line is a non-electrified railway line of the Korean State Railway in Kaech'ŏn city, South P'yŏngan Province, North Korea, running from Pongch'ŏn on the Manp'o Line to Pongch'ŏn Colliery, serving a major anthracite mine.

History

The line was opened on 15 October 1933 by the Chosen Government Railway, at the same time as the third section of the Manp'o Line from Kaech'ŏn to Kujang.

Route 

A yellow background in the "Distance" box indicates that section of the line is not electrified.

References

Railway lines in North Korea
Standard gauge railways in North Korea